Tongcheng is a county-level city and former county in the southwest of Anhui province and is under the jurisdiction of the prefecture-level city of Anqing. Tongcheng is noted for the Tongcheng School.

Administrative divisions
Tongcheng City has jurisdiction over 3 subdistricts, 12 towns and 2 others.
Subdistricts
Longteng Subdistrict
Wenchang Subdistrict
Longmin Subdistrict

Towns

Others
Tongcheng Economic Development Zone
Tongcheng Shuangxin Economic Development Zone

Climate

Notable people
 Zhang Tingyu, advisor to three Qing Dynasty emperors
 Chu Bo, the former governor of Hunan Province, and currently party chief in Inner Mongolia, was born in Tongcheng.
 Fang Bao, author
 Fang Lanfen, author
 Fang Quan, author, Qing prefect
 Fang Chih, Chinese diplomat
 Gui Congyou, diplomat, appointed China's ambassador to Sweden in 2017
 Wang Wenbin, diplomat, one of the spokesperson for the Ministry of Foreign Affairs 
 Zuo Guangdou, late Ming Dynasty censorate official

References

External links
Government website of Tongcheng (in Simplified Chinese)
Website of Tongcheng Middle School (in Simplified Chinese)
Tourism Information of Tongcheng (in Simplified Chinese)
Tongcheng Normal School (in Simplified Chinese)

Cities in Anhui
Anqing